Kamlesh Gill is an Indian actress of Hindi films, best known for the films Vicky Donor (2012), Bang Bang! (2014) and PK (2014).

She was nominated for Screen Award for Best Comedian and Zee Cine Award for Best Supporting Actress for her performance in Vicky Donor.

Filmography

Footnotes

External links

Living people
Indian film actresses
Actresses in Hindi cinema
Year of birth missing (living people)
21st-century Indian actresses
Place of birth missing (living people)